Chita Railway Station is the primary passenger railway station for the city of Chita in Russia, and an important stop along the Trans-Siberian Railway.

Trains

Major Domestic Routes 
 Moscow — Vladivostok
 Novosibirsk — Vladivostok
 Moscow — Khabarovsk
 Novosibirsk — Neryungri
 Adler — Chita

International

References

Railway stations in Zabaykalsky Krai
Trans-Siberian Railway
Railway stations in the Russian Empire opened in 1899
Cultural heritage monuments in Zabaykalsky Krai
Objects of cultural heritage of Russia of regional significance